Dromgold is a surname. Notable people with the surname include:

George Dromgold (1893–1948), American actor and writer
R. W. Dromgold ( 1856–1918), American businessman and politician